Wailua (literally, "two waters" in Hawaiian) is a census-designated place (CDP) in Kauai County, Hawaii, United States. The population was 2,359 at the 2020 census, up from 2,083 at the 2000 census.

Geography

Wailua is located at  (22.058631, -159.341761), on the east side of the island of Kauai. It is bordered to the north by Kapaa, to the west by the Wailua Homesteads CDP, to the south by the Wailua River, and to the east by the Pacific Ocean.

Inland Wailua is often referred to as a bedroom community, since it is home to many, but lacks any commercial or government facilities. Coastal Wailua is a significant commercial center, with many hotels and condominiums for visitors. The Wailua River is the only navigable river in the state of Hawaii and is a center of activity for locals (water skiing, kayaking) and visitors (boat tour of Fern Grotto).

Demographics

As of the census of 2000, there were 2,083 people, 781 households, and 549 families residing in the CDP. The racial makeup of the CDP was 29.7% White, 0.8% African American, 0.5% Native American, 34.8% Asian, 8.5% Pacific Islander, 0.6% from other races, and 25.1% from two or more races. Hispanic or Latino of any race were 7.1% of the population.

There were 781 households, out of which 30.7% had children under the age of 18 living with them, 52.1% were married couples living together, 12.4% had a female householder with no husband present, and 29.7% were non-families. 23.8% of all households were made up of individuals, and 8.1% had someone living alone who was 65 years of age or older.  The average household size was 2.67 and the average family size was 3.16.

In the CDP the population was spread out, with 25.4% under the age of 18, 6.2% from 18 to 24, 25.3% from 25 to 44, 25.6% from 45 to 64, and 17.4% who were 65 years of age or older.  The median age was 41 years. For every 100 females, there were 102.0 males.  For every 100 females age 18 and over, there were 98.2 males.

The median income for a household in the CDP was $45,875, and the median income for a family was $52,083. Males had a median income of $34,615 versus $25,380 for females. The per capita income for the CDP was $20,231.  About 8.7% of families and 8.9% of the population were below the poverty line, including 9.5% of those under age 18 and none of those age 65 or over.

References

Census-designated places in Kauai County, Hawaii
Populated places on Kauai
Populated coastal places in Hawaii